Viet Hong is a commune in Thanh Hà District, Hải Dương Province, Vietnam.

It has an area of 5.78 km². In 1999 its population was 4,400 people for a population density reaching 761 persons / km².

References

Communes of Thanh Ha District, Hai Duong Province